Benjamin James Goldsmith (born 28 October 1980) is an English financier and environmentalist. The son of financier James Goldsmith and Lady Annabel Goldsmith he is founder and CEO of London-listed investment firm Menhaden, which focuses on the theme of energy and resource efficiency. Previously he co-founded the sustainability-focused investment firm WHEB, whose private equity business split away in 2014 and now trades under the name Alpina Partners.  He has used his personal wealth to support both philanthropic and political projects in the area of the environment and sustainability.

Personal life 
Goldsmith was born in London and is the youngest child of the late billionaire James Goldsmith, a member of the prominent Jewish Goldsmith family, and his third wife Lady Annabel Vane-Tempest-Stewart. He has an older sister, Jemima Goldsmith; an older brother, Zac Goldsmith; and several half-siblings. Influenced by his older brother Zac, he has a passion for the environment inherited from their father, who, towards the end of his life, was one of Europe's most prominent founders of green causes, including campaigns against genetically modified food. His uncle Teddy Goldsmith was a co-founder of the Green Party UK and also of The Ecologist.

On 20 September 2003, at St Mary's Church in Bury St Edmunds, he married heiress Kate Emma Rothschild (b. 1982), the daughter of the late Amschel Rothschild and his wife, Anita Patience Guinness, of the Guinness Brewery family.

The couple were married for nine years and had three children: Iris Annabel (2004–2019), Frank James Amschel (b. 2005) and Isaac Benjamin Victor (b. 2008). On 2 June 2012 it was reported that Kate, a music producer, had been having an extramarital affair with rapper Jay Electronica for a year. In the same month, he was arrested for domestic violence against his wife before being released without charge. Goldsmith later announced that he was filing for divorce citing his wife's adultery. They divorced in April 2013.

He married Jemima Jones in 2014. She runs the catering company Tart London and the restaurant Wild by Tart. The couple have three children: Eliza Margot, Arlo and Vita.

On 8 July 2019, Goldsmith's fifteen-year-old daughter, Iris, died in a quad bike accident on his farm in North Brewham, Somerset.

Career 
Goldsmith attended Eton College, an independent English public school, and like his billionaire father, did not attend university.

Business 
In 2003, Goldsmith became a partner in WHEB, and led the pivot of that company, which had been founded in 1995, from serving as a corporate finance adviser into providing venture capital to the European clean technology sector. In 2014 Goldsmith oversaw the demerger of WHEB's private and public equity businesses, with the former rebranding Alpina Partners.

In 2015 Goldsmith launched Menhaden Capital, a thematic investment trust focused on efficient energy and resource use. In July 2018 the trust reached its three-year milestone with a 30.5% drop in share price.

Ben Goldsmith was described by London's Evening Standard in 2011 as "the quiet force of the Goldsmith family... believed to be a key figure in looking after the family finances."

Environment 
In 2003 Goldsmith co-founded the UK Environmental Funders Network (EFN), along with Jon Cracknell. He described EFN as being "designed to facilitate discussion and foster collaboration" among those interested in funding environmental initiatives, particularly those addressing large-scale problems like global warming. As part of its work EFN gathers information on environmental giving and disseminates it via its "Where Green Grants Went" report. The network aims to help trusts, foundations and individuals to support environmental causes effectively. 

Through JMG Foundation, the family foundation that Goldsmith chairs, he is also directly involved in activist environmental philanthropy.  

In 2008, Goldsmith set up The Conservation Collective, a global network of 16 local environmental foundations rooted in their communities covering regions from Devon and Tuscany, islands such as Mallorca, Ibiza and Formentera and Lamu and countries including Pakistan and Barbados. By 2022, the group had raised £6.6 million pounds to protect and restore nature.

Since 2010, Goldsmith has developed a reputation for providing strategic and financial support to disruptive environmental leaders such as Derek Gow, who has led work to restore formerly missing native species to Britain, including beavers, water voles, white storks and wild cats."

In 2016 Goldsmith was appointed a trustee of the Children's Investment Fund Foundation, one of the largest environmental foundations in Europe, founded by financier and philanthropist Chris Hohn.

In 2017, Goldsmith participated in Forces for Nature, a major report released by EFN. The report aimed to encourage more philanthropists to support environmental issues and explores how environmental contributors can be more effective.

In 2018, Goldsmith was appointed non-executive director at the Department for Environment, Food and Rural Affairs. This proved controversial as he had previously donated cash to Michael Gove's Surrey Heath constituency and the selection process for the job was overseen by Sir Ian Cheshire, who is chairman of Goldsmith's investment firm, Menhaden. Complaints about the appointment included comments that Goldsmith is a member of the "urban elite", and that though interested in the environment he had no experience with environmental issues facing farmers in the United Kingdom.

In 2019 Goldsmith was one of the first funders to support Beaver Trust, set up by James Wallace, Chris Jones, Iain Beath and Nicky Saunter, a new national British charity for beavers and helped drive government policy to recognise beavers as a native species and give them protected status in England in 2022." Working with James Wallace of the Beaver Trust, in 2021 Goldsmith helped instigate a progressive nature restoration programme, a farm payment scheme 'Woodlands for Water' to pay landowners to create thousands of hectares of new woodland buffers along rivers through a partnership between Defra, Forestry Commission and four NGOs, National Trust, Woodland Trust, Rivers Trust and Beaver Trust."

In 2021 Goldsmith established the Nattergal real estate company with Sir Charles Burrell and Peter Davies. The aim of Nattergal is to acquire agriculturally marginal land on which to facilitate nature recovery at scale using rewilding, based upon the learning of over 20 years at Knepp Wildland, while demonstrating a sustainable financial return. Nattergal's first site is Boothby Lodge Farm, a 605 hectare low grade arable farm in Lincolnshire."

Politics 
Goldsmith is a long-standing funder of the Green Party, including giving £20,000 in 2004 to the UK Green Party and again prior to the 2010 General Election in which Caroline Lucas became Britain's first elected Green Member of Parliament. In subsequent years, Goldsmith has also contributed to the UK Conservative Party as well as individual candidates like Conservative MP Michael Gove and the so-called "Notting Hill set of Conservative modernisers".

Goldsmith is chair of the Conservative Environment Network (CEN) which was founded in 2010. The CEN seeks to raise the issue of environmental protection on the agenda of the UK Conservative Party. By 2021 the CEN parliamentary caucus had grown to comprise more than 130 MPs.

At a talk at the UK Centre for Jewish Life in 2013, Goldsmith said that a Zionist is simply someone who believes that the Jews have a right to have their own state in Israel, and therefore described himself as an "ardent Zionist."

In 2016 he campaigned for his brother Zac Goldsmith who was running for mayor of London.

Goldsmith was a key signatory to a petition sent to Prime Minister Theresa May and Michael Gove urging them to ban all crop spraying and pesticide use in UK rural residential areas.

Ancestry

References

1980 births
Living people
English environmentalists
English businesspeople
English people of French descent
English people of German-Jewish descent
People educated at Eton College
English Christians
Ben